Angus McInnes was a Scottish professional footballer who played as an inside forward. He had two spells for Burnley in the English Football League, as well as playing non-league football with nearby Padiham.

References

Year of birth unknown
Year of death unknown
Scottish footballers
Association football inside forwards
Burnley F.C. players
English Football League players
Padiham F.C. players